The 1923 California Golden Bears football team was an American football team that represented the University of California, Berkeley in the Pacific Coast Conference (PCC) during the 1923 college football season. In their eighth year under head coach Andy Smith, the team compiled a 9–0–1 record (5–0 against PCC opponents), shut out nine of ten opponents, won the PCC championship, and outscored its opponents by a combined total of 182 to 7. The team was selected retroactively as a 1923 national champion by Deke Houlgate, who used his math system to award annual national titles from 1929 to 1958.

Schedule

References

California
California Golden Bears football seasons
College football national champions
Pac-12 Conference football champion seasons
College football undefeated seasons
California Golden Bears football